Godava is a 2007 Telugu-language film directed by A. Kodandarami Reddy and stars his son Vaibhav Reddy and Shraddha Arya in the lead roles alongside Sayaji Shinde who plays a supporting role. This film marks the film debut of Reddy and the Telugu film debut of Arya.

Plot 
To avoid marriage, Anjali gets into a fake relationship with her collegemate Balu.

Cast 

Vaibhav Reddy as Balu
Shraddha Arya as Anjali
Sayaji Shinde as Anjali's father 
Chalapathi Rao as Balu's father
Delhi Rajeshwari as Balu's mother
Annapoorna
Brahmanandam as College Principal
Sunil as Train Ticket Collector
Ashwini as Anjali's friend
Chitram Seenu as Balu's friend
Babloo
Delhi Ganesh
AVS as Temple Priest
Venu Madhav
Jaya Prakash Reddy
Raghu Babu
M. S. Narayana
Nagendra Babu as the Chief Guest for Youth Festival (cameo appearance)
Zabyn Khan as an item number

Production 
Due to the fact that the lead actor's real name, Sumanth, was already the name of an established actor, Kodandarami Reddy asked Chiranjeevi to pick a name from a list of ten names that Reddy had selected for his son. Chiranjeevi picked out the name Vaibhav from the list to be Sumanth Reddy's stage name. The filming was completed in September 2007.

Soundtrack
Soundtrack was composed by Mani Sharma. The audio was launched on 10 September 2007. The songs were shot Bangkok, Malaysia and Visakhapatnam. Balakrishna attended the audio launch as a chief guest.
Evaro Nuvva - Ranjith, Kalyani
Current Kastha - Rita
Mounamlo - NC Karunya
Okkasaari - Rahul,sunita
Hutch Phone - KK, Deepa, Kousalya

Release
The film was released on 7 December along with Sivaji-starrer State Rowdy. The film was released with 31 prints. The film released to negative reviews. Rediff gave the film a rating of one out of five stars and noted that "The motive behind such films is nothing but an excuse to showcase the wannabe star's dancing prowess and action shots".

References

External links
 

2007 films
2000s Telugu-language films
Films directed by A. Kodandarami Reddy
Films scored by Mani Sharma
Films shot in Visakhapatnam
Films shot in Bangkok
Films shot in Malaysia